Joniškis (Samogitian: Juonėškis) is a town in northern Lithuania with a population of about 9,900. It is located 39 kilometers north of Šiauliai and 14 kilometers south of the Lithuania–Latvia border. Joniškis is the municipal and administrative centre of Joniškis district municipality.

With the Church of the Accession of the Holy Virgin Mary (founded in 1901) and a complex of two Jewish synagogues – The Red Synagogue (built in 1897) and The White Synagogue (built in 1823) – at its center, the town has the status of an urban architectural heritage site.

A railway line connecting Riga and Šiauliai runs along the western boundary of the town. West of the railway are the town's allotment gardens, the Lutheran Cemetery and the Cemetery for the Victims of World War II. Joniškis has two water reservoirs formed by dams on the River Sidabra. Joniškis has the Jonas Avyžius Public Library of Joniškis District Municipality, the Basketball Museum and a large animal compound feed manufacturing plant "Joniškio Grūdai".

Name
Joniškis is the Lithuanian name of the town. Historical versions of the name in other languages include Polish: Janiszki, Russian: Янишки Yanishki, Yiddish: יאַנישאָק Yanishok, Latvian: Jānišķe, and German: Jonischken.

History
Joniškis was established in the beginning of the 16th century. It was mentioned in written sources on 23 February 1536 when Bishops of Vilnius and Samogitia visited the area and found that people still practiced the old pagan faith. People were worshiping the God of Thunder (Perkūnas), fire, snakes and other pagan deities. The bishop of Vilnius, John of the Lithuanian Dukes baptized the locals and established a new parish on 23 February 1536. A wooden church was built and the town of Joniškis was built around it. The bishop of Vilnius named the town Joniškis after his own name Jonas. Joniškis was on the crossroad of important trade roads.

In late 1941, 148 Jewish men were shot near Joniškis in the nearby forest. The remaining Jews (men, women and children) were murdered in the forest in September 1941. 493 people were murdered in total by an Einsatzgruppen of Joniškis policemen and Lithuanian nationalists supervised by the Germans.

Climate
Joniškis has a warm-summer humid continental climate (Dfb in the Köppen climate classification).

Gallery

Notable people
Laurence Harvey
Maksimas Katche
Charles Segal
Andrius Šležas
Adomas Varnas
Benas Veikalas

Twin towns – sister cities

Joniškis is twinned with:

 Auce, Latvia
 Dobele, Latvia
 Jelgava Municipality, Latvia
 Konin, Poland
 Novoselitsky District, Ukraine
 Sulingen, Germany
 Ungheni, Moldova
 Vimmerby, Sweden
 Võru, Estonia

References

External links
Official site
The murder of the Jews of Joniškis during World War II, at Yad Vashem website.

 
Cities in Šiauliai County
Cities in Lithuania
Municipalities administrative centres of Lithuania
Duchy of Samogitia
Shavelsky Uyezd
Holocaust locations in Lithuania
Joniškis District Municipality